The Protagonists is a 1999 crime thriller film written and directed by Luca Guadagnino in his directorial debut. It stars Tilda Swinton and Fabrizia Sacchi.

The film had its world premiere at the Venice Film Festival on September 8, 1999, before being released on September 10, 1999, by Medusa Distribuzione.

Cast
 Tilda Swinton as Actress
 Fabrizia Sacchi as herself
 Andrew Tiernan as Mohammed
 Claudio Gioè as Happy
 Paolo Briguglia as Billy
 Michelle Hunziker as Sue
 Jhelisa as herself
 Laura Betti as Judge

Plot
The film chronicles an Italian film crew who are in London making a reconstruction of the real life killing of Egyptian chef Mohamed El-Sayed by the two 19-year-olds Jamie Petrolini and Richard Elsey in 1994.

Production
Production on the film began in 1998, with principal photography taking place in London.

Release
The film had its world premiere at the Venice Film Festival on September 8, 1999. It was released in Italy on September 10, 1999, by Medusa Distribuzione.

It was released in the United Kingdom on October 13, 2014.

Critical reception
The film received negative reviews from critics.

References

External links
 

1999 films
1999 directorial debut films
Italian crime thriller films
1999 crime thriller films
Films about filmmaking
Films directed by Luca Guadagnino